KLS may stand for: 

 Kalash language (ISO 639 code: kls), a language of Pakistan
 Key Largo School, a school in Florida, US
 Khitan large script, an undeciphered Chinese script
 KIIT Law School, Bhubaneswar, India
 Sportswear brand of Kimora Lee Simmons
 Kleine–Levin syndrome, a sleep disorder
 Kobalt Label Services, a British record label
 Kolss Cycling Team (UCI code: KLS), a Ukrainian cycling team
 Košarkaška liga Srbije (Cyrillic: Кошаркашка лига Србије), the Basketball League of Serbia
 Kuala Lumpur–Kuala Selangor Expressway, an expressway in Malaysia

 Order of the Lion and the Sun (Knight of Lion and Sun), Iran
 Southwest Washington Regional Airport, US, FAA/IATA airport code